The 2012–13 1. FSV Mainz 05 season is the 108th season in the club's football history. In 2012–13 the club plays in the Bundesliga, the top tier of German football. It is the club's fourth consecutive season in this league, having been promoted from the 2. Bundesliga at the conclusion of the 2008–09 season.

The club also takes part in the 2012–13 edition of the DFB-Pokal, the German Cup, where Mainz was eliminated in the quarter-final stage by fellow Bundesliga side SC Freiburg on 26 February 2013.

Review and events

Match Results

Legend

Bundesliga

Table

League table

DFB-Pokal

Squad information

Squad and statistics

|-
! colspan="12" style="background:#dcdcdc; text-align:center;"| Goalkeepers

|-
! colspan="12" style="background:#dcdcdc; text-align:center;"| Defenders

|-
! colspan="12" style="background:#dcdcdc; text-align:center;"| Midfielders

|-
! colspan="12" style="background:#dcdcdc; text-align:center;"| Strikers

|}

Transfers

In

Out

Sources

External links
 2012–13 1. FSV Mainz 05 season at Weltfussball.de 
 2012–13 1. FSV Mainz 05 season at kicker.de 
 2012–13 1. FSV Mainz 05 season at Fussballdaten.de 

Mainz 05
1. FSV Mainz 05 seasons